The 2022 PNGNRL season was the 32nd season of the professional rugby league competition in Papua New Guinea. It was known by the sponsorship name, Digicel Cup.

Regular season 
All times are in AEST (UTC+10:00) and AEDT (UTC+11:00) on the relevant dates.

The 2022 PNGNRL season was the 32nd season of the professional rugby league competition in  Papua New Guinea. It was known by the sponsorship name, Digicel Cup.

Round 1

Round 2

Round 3

Round 4

Round 5

Round 6

Round 7

Round 8

Round 9

Round 10

Round 11

Round 12

Round 13

Round 14

Round 15

Round 16

Round 17

References

Papua New Guinea National Rugby League
2022 in Papua New Guinea rugby league